Leonardo Ffrench Iduarte is a retired career Mexican Ambassador who served in variety of posts. He was the Foreign Press spokesperson for President Carlos Salinas and the first full-time spokesman at the Mexican Embassy in the US. He was also Consul General of Mexico in Denver and in Chicago. He was the  Director General of IME the Institute for Mexicans Abroad during the last three years of the Ernesto Zedillo administration. He is currently a political and social commentator  and consultant living in Cuernavaca, Morelos, Mexico. Ambassador Ffrench has been among Mexico's diplomatic corps retirees most active in lobbying for cost of living pension adjustments.

References
La Estrella: A chat with Ambassador Leonardo Ffrench Iduarte
Anted del Caos: Interview with former Ambassador Leonardo Ffrench
Hoy: Feb 16 2010: Piden mas ayuda para los migrantes
Cronica de Mexico: May 2011: El orgullo de extradirtar
El Universal: February 2013: Diplomaticos jubilados buscar defensa
El Universal: September 2018: Embajadas son refugio politico
Dinero en Imagen: October 2018: Propriedades Fifi en Washington
Jornada: Ultimas: Politica: January 27, 2019: Exige Mexico solucion pacifica y democratica para Venezuela

People from Cuernavaca
Living people
Ambassadors of Mexico
Year of birth missing (living people)